Acartauchenius asiaticus is a species of sheet weaver found in Turkmenistan. It was described by Tanasevitch in 1989.

References

Linyphiidae
Spiders described in 1989
Spiders of Asia